Saroj Gupta Cancer Centre and Research Institute, formerly known as "Cancer Centre Welfare Home & Research Institute" is a hospital that is spread over an area of 16 acres of land. It is a fully comprehensive, dedicated cancer hospital with 311 beds and over 850 staff members. This is a nonprofit organization. The SGCC&RI is located in Thakurpukur, on the outskirts of the city of Kolkata, West Bengal. It is one of the oldest Cancer treatment centre of Kolkata.

Specialties 
The specialties at the SGCC&RI include Surgical Oncology, Radiotherapy, Medical Oncology, Haemato-Oncology, Radiology, Pain & Palliative Care, Supportive Therapy, Pathology and Microbiology, Molecular Genetic Lab, Nicotine Replacement Therapy, Dialysis Unit.

History 
In 1973 with the help of few doctors and social workers, Saroj Gupta started a 25 bedded hospital to serve patients from the underprivileged sector, suffering from cancer. The family of Late Chintaharan Das donated a piece of marshy land at Thakurpukur, where the Saroj Gupta Cancer and Research Institute came up. This newly founded hospital started catering to the people who came from rural areas for their cancer treatment. The hospital raised its first fund from a drama staged by a group called Sikha, which was based on a story written by the founder, Saroj Gupta himself, where he himself enacted the role of a poor cancer patient who was denied a bed in the city hospital.

Recognition and membership 
It is recognized by the World Health Organization and has a membership with Union for International Cancer Control (UICC), Geneva, Switzerland.

Programmes 
Saroj Gupta Cancer Centre and Research Institute had organized a month-long awareness programme on Nicotine Replacement Therapy (NRT), with the support of Warwick University Development Education WD (City of London), Nara Medical University (Japan), Dental School (London), and ITTE (Mangalore). The NRT programme was organized with the objective to create an awareness on the dangerous habit of chewing and smoking tobacco.

Academics & research 
The SGCC&RI runs post-graduate degree courses which are recognized by Central Council and it also houses a library with up-to-date national and internationally reviewed journals.

References

External links 
 http://www.cancercentrecalcutta.org

Hospitals in Kolkata
Healthcare in Kolkata
Hospitals established in 1973
1973 establishments in West Bengal